The 2018–19 Buildbase FA Vase is the 45th season of the FA Vase, an annual football competition for teams playing below Step 4 of the English National League System.   The competition is to be played with two qualifying rounds preceding the six proper rounds, semi-finals (played over two legs) and final to be played at Wembley Stadium.  All first-leg ties until the semi-finals are played with extra time if drawn after regulation – first-leg ties may also be resolved with penalties if both teams agree and notify the referee at least 45 minutes before kick-off.

Calendar
The calendar for the 2018–19 Buildbase FA Vase, as announced by The Football Association.

First Round Qualifying

Second Round Qualifying

First round proper

Second round proper

Third round proper

Fourth round proper

Fifth Round Proper

Quarter-finals

Semi-finals
Semi final fixtures were played on 16 March and 23 March 2019, with the second leg going to extra time and penalties if required.

First leg

Second leg

Cray Valley Paper Mills won 2-1 on aggregate

Chertsey Town F.C. won 5-3 on penalties after drawing 1–1 on aggregate

Final

References

FA Vase seasons
FA Vase
2018–19 in English football